Russia competed at the 2018 Summer Youth Olympics, in Buenos Aires, Argentina from 6 to 18 October 2018. A total of 93 athletes competed in 24 sports. There were no Russian athletes in badminton, canoeing, equestrian, field hockey, golf, roller speed skating, rowing, rugby sevens and weightlifting.

The Olympic banner was passed to Kliment Kolesnikov by Stanislav Pozdnyakov, president of the Russian Olympic Committee. The flagbearer in the closing ceremony was Sergei Chernyshev, the first Olympic breakdance gold medalist.

Already on Day 10, Russia topped the medal table of the Youth Olympics, with 25 gold, 15 silver and 12 bronze medals collecting. On the next day they collected three more gold medals and one more silver medal, breaking their previous Olympics' record by number of gold medals. Also on the last day, Russia broke another record by total medals, winning overall 59 medals, two more than in the previous Olympics.

Medalists

Medals awarded to participants of mixed-NOC teams are represented in italics. These medals are not counted towards the individual NOC medal tally.

|width="30%" align=left valign=top|

Competitors
The following is the list of number of competitors that could participate at the Games per sport/discipline.

Archery

Russia qualified two archers based on its performance at the 2017 World Archery Youth Championships.

Athletics

Boys
Field events

Girls
Field events

Basketball

Russia qualified a boys' team based on the U18 3x3 National Federation Ranking.

Team roster
Vasilii Berdnikov 
Khasan Kipkeev 
Nikita Remizov
Timur Vagapov

Boys' tournament

Dunk contest

Beach handball

Team roster
Victoria Davydova
Kristina Grigorovskaya
Anna Ivanova
Ekaterina Karabutova
Ekaterina Karpova
Sofia Krakhmaleva 
Sofya Savina
Anastasia Skripka
Anna Volkova

Girls' tournament

Beach volleyball

Russia qualified a boys' and girls' team based on their performance at 2017-18 European Youth Continental Cup Final.

Boxing

Boys

Girls

Cycling

Russia qualified a boys' and girls' combined team based on its ranking in the Youth Olympic Games Junior Nation Rankings. They also qualified a mixed BMX racing team based on its ranking in the Youth Olympic Games BMX Junior Nation Rankings and two athletes in BMX freestyle based on its performance at the 2018 Urban Cycling World Championship.

Combined team

BMX freestyle park

BMX racing

Dancesport

Russia qualified two dancers based on its performance at the 2018 World Youth Breaking Championship.

Diving

Fencing

Russia qualified three athletes based on its performance at the 2018 Cadet World Championship.

Boys

Girls

Futsal

Summary

Team roster
Head coach: Sergei Skorovich

Group stage

Semifinal

Final

Gymnastics

Acrobatic
Russia qualified a mixed pair based on its performance at the 2018 Acrobatic Gymnastics World Championship.

Artistic
Russia qualified two gymnasts based on its performance at the 2018 European Junior Championship.

Boys

Girls

Rhythmic
Russia qualified one rhythmic gymnast based on its performance at the European qualification event.

Trampoline
Russia qualified one gymnast based on its performance at the 2018 European Junior Championship.

Multidiscipline

Judo

Individual

Team

Karate

Russia qualified two athletes based on its performance at one of the Karate Qualification Tournaments.

Modern pentathlon

Russia qualified one pentathlete based on its performance at the European Youth Olympic Games Qualifier.

Sailing

Russia qualified female boat based on its performance at the 2017 Techno 293+ World Championship. They later qualified a male boat based on its performance at the Techno 293+ European Qualifier.

Shooting

Russia qualified two sport shooters based on its performance at the 2017 European Championships. Russia later qualified a female rifle sport shooter based on its performance at the 2018 European Championships.

Individual

Team

Sport climbing

Russia qualified three sport climbers based on its performance at the 2017 World Youth Sport Climbing Championships.

Swimming

Boys

Girls

Mixed

Table tennis

Russia qualified two table tennis players based on its performance at the European Continental Qualifier.

Taekwondo

Boys

Girls

Tennis

Triathlon

Russia qualified one athlete based on its performance at the 2018 European Youth Olympic Games Qualifier.

Individual

Relay

Wrestling

Boys

References

External links
NOC Schedule – Russian Federation

Winter Olympics
Nations at the 2018 Summer Youth Olympics
Russia at the Youth Olympics